The Cemetery of Lost Cemeteries is a monument that commemorates the necropolis which no longer exists in the city of Gdańsk, Poland.

It is dedicated to the citizens of Gdańsk who were once buried in one of the city’s 27 graveyards either destroyed during World War II or bulldozed on purpose after the end of the war. 

The monument was designed to resemble a temple. 

The main memorial is surrounded by broken gravestones representing all faiths, and includes a poem by the Jewish poet Mascha Kaléko (1912–1975), whose poetry was burned on the direct orders of Hitler in May 1933.

Project Designers
The designers of the project are:
Hanna Klementowska, Jacek Krenz 
Design Team: Katarzyna Bogucka-Krenz, Michał Krenz, Andrzej Wójcicki,  
Sculptors: Zygfryd Korpalski, Witold Głuchowski 
Funded by: the Gdańsk City Hall in 2002

It is located at 3 Maja Street in the park between the Church of Corpus Christi and the bus station.

Stone and light, the symbolic meaning
The layout of the Cemetery of the Lost Cemeteries echoes a temple interior. The colonnade of trees creates an atmosphere reminiscent of the main nave and side aisles. The stone columns are in the shape of trunks, symbolizing withered trees long since dead, but thanks to the light which pervades from within are brought back to life. The granite slab placed on a foundation of broken fragments of gravestones forms both a sacrificial altar and a symbolic tomb. The inscription which is engraved around the granite comes from a poem by Mascha Kaléko whose volumes of poetry were among the books burnt on the pyre in May 1933 on Hitler’s orders. Thus, from the ashes these poetic words will now speak again chiseled in stone to last. The lights set within the granite altar project upwards leading our thoughts to transcendence and thus binding the many burial places of various faiths into one metaphysical unity. These columns of light represent the firm faith of the people and seen within the light wisps of smoke from the votive candles remind us at the same time of the fragility of human life. Behind the altar there is a hedge cut into the shape of a semicircular apse which provides a final screen to this natural sanctuary. In the middle of the hedge there is an opening behind which we can see a wall of whitened stone - a symbolic passage for the dead who proceed towards eternity.

The Living Memory
The Cemetery of the Lost Cemeteries is meant to be a place of our common prayer commemorating all those generations who have lived and died in Gdańsk before us and whose place of burial no longer exists. It is a peaceful place for silent reflection, unifying all people regardless of their social status, race, nationality or religious adherence. Here the citizens of our town may ponder in peace the fate of their forefathers. Here they also may place the few remaining fragments which have been retrieved from the cemeteries which no longer exist. 

Thanks to the memories of individuals who will visit this place we will be able to recreate in our hearts a symbolic map of the common past of our town which - thanks to its close proximity to the sea and rich trading links - has always been the home to people of many different faith and nations.

External links
 Jacek Krenz - Temples and monuments

Monuments and memorials in Poland
Landscape architecture
Buildings and structures in Gdańsk
Tourist attractions in Gdańsk